Gerimenj (also Romanized as Gerīmenj, Germānj, Girimānj, Gīrīmenj, Kerīmonj; also known as Gerīmench) is a village in Nimbeluk Rural District, Nimbeluk District, Qaen County, South Khorasan Province, Iran. At the 2006 census, its population was 807, in 220 families.

References 

Populated places in Qaen County